A King in the Kindness Room is the ninth solo album by Australian guitarist and songwriter Ed Kuepper recorded in 1995 and released on the Hot label. The album peaked at number 99 on the ARIA Charts.

Reception
The Allmusic review by Ned Raggett awarded the album 3 stars and states "Kuepper's all-around abilities — he plays all the guitars and most of the bass — readily come to the fore, with his own particular combination of psychedelic murk and straightforward playing in evidence throughout. It resists all trends, and all for the better at that".

Track listing
All compositions by Ed Kuepper except as indicated
 "Confession of a Window Cleaner" – 5:49
 "Pissed Off" – 3:09
 "Highway to Hell" (Bon Scott, Angus Young, Malcolm Young) – 5:08
 "Messin' Pt. II" – 7:10
 "They Call Me Mr. Sexy (Love Theme from CCR vs the 3rd Reich)" – 9:01
 "Sundown" (Gordon Lightfoot) – 4:40
 "Space Pirate" – 4:27
 "The Diving Board" – 3:25
 Recorded at Electric Avenue, Sydney, Australia in early 1995.

Personnel
Ed Kuepper – vocals, acoustic guitar, electric guitar, elastic guitar, bass guitar
Mark Dawson – drums, percussion
Louise Elliott – flute, saxophone
Linda Neil – violin
Philip Punch – additional drums
John Napier – cello
Victor Round, Mark Costa – additional bass

Charts

References

Hot Records albums
Ed Kuepper albums
1995 albums